Jean-Claude Frécon (3 September 1944 – 10 December 2016) was a member of the Senate of France, representing the Loire department, and is the current president of the Congress of Local and Regional Authorities of the Council of Europe after having served as Vice-President since 2002. In 2010, he was elected the President of the Chamber of Local Authorities (one of the two chambers of the Congress). He was also elected head of the French Delegation in the Congress in 2004.

He was a member of the French Socialist Party.

Congressional Profile
Frécon was the Vice-President of the Group of independent experts on the European Charter of local self-government, and as a result was the Congress spokesman in June 1998 on “finances and responsibilities of local administration in Europe” and in June 2000 on “ financial resources of local administration, responsibilities and the principle of subsidiarity”.

He was the Congress Spokesman on: Azerbaijan, "The former Yugoslav Republic of Macedonia", Romania, the financial situation of local administration in Germany and general Spokesman for the European Forum of local democracy in Kiev (2009).

He has been an elections observer in the following countries:
Albania
Azerbaijan
"The former Yugoslav Republic of Macedonia"
Israel
Palestine
Romania
Chechnya

He was instrumental in missions in Sarajevo for the preparation of elections, in Morocco for the implementation of decentralization and for monitoring missions in Albania, Armenia, Belarus, Croatia, Georgia, Montenegro, Russia, Slovenia, Latvia.

References
Page on the Senate Website
Page on the Congress Website

1944 births
2016 deaths
French Senators of the Fifth Republic
Congress of the Council of Europe
Socialist Party (France) politicians
Senators of Loire (department)